Overton Peak is a peak in the Desko Mountains, rising to about  at the southeast end of Rothschild Island. It was named by the Advisory Committee on Antarctic Names after Commander Robert H. Overton, U.S. Coast Guard, Executive Officer, USCGC Westwind, U.S. Navy Operation Deep Freeze, 1971.

Further reading 
 J.L. SMELLIE, Lithostratigraphy of Miocene-Recent, alkaline volcanic fields in the Antarctic Peninsula and eastern Ellsworth Land, Antarctic Science 71 (3): 362-378 (1999)

External links 

 Overton Peak on USGS website
 Overton Peak on SCAR website
 Overton Peak distance calculator
 Current weather at Overton Peak
 Long term updated weather forecast for Overton Peak
 Historical weather data for Overton Peak

References 

Mountains of Palmer Land